Meet the Missus is a 1937 American domestic comedy film directed by Joseph Santley, using a screenplay by Jack Townley, Bert Granet, and Joel Sayre, based on an original story by Jack Goodman and Albert Rice. The movie was produced and distributed by RKO Radio Pictures, and was initially released on June 4, 1937. The film stars Victor Moore and Helen Broderick (in the fifth of their six 1936–38 films) as well as Anne Shirley.

Plot
Mrs. Foster loves to enter contests which she never wins.  Mr. Foster is exasperated with his wife.  The Happy Noodle Company is looking for Mrs. America and Emma Foster becomes a finalist.  The couple go to Atlantic City for the finals.  Emma never had time to do homemaker chores and during the contest she has to get her husband Otis to do the work.  Other husbands were likewise frustrated with the contest and their wives.  The wives went full force to out do the other finalists.

Cast
Victor Moore as Otis Foster - Husband
Helen Broderick as Emma Foster - Wife
Anne Shirley as Louise Foster - Daughter
Alan Bruce as Steve Walton
Edward H. Robins as Gordon H. Cutting
William Brisbane as Prentiss
Frank M. Thomas as Barney Lott
Ray Mayer as John White
Ada Leonard as Princess Zarina - Stripper
George Irving as District Attorney
Alec Craig as College President
Willie Best as Mose - Shoe Shine Boy
Virginia Sale as Mrs. Moseby - Emma's Maid
Jack Norton as Mr. Norton aka Mr. Cotton Belt

References

External links

Meet the Missus at TV Guide (1987 write-up was originally published in The Motion Picture Guide)

RKO Pictures films
Films directed by Joseph Santley
1937 comedy films
1937 films
American comedy films
American black-and-white films
Films scored by Roy Webb
1930s American films
Films about beauty pageants
Films set in Atlantic City, New Jersey